The Chandel district of Manipur state in India is divided into 3 administrative sub-divisions. At the time of the 2011 Census of India, the Machi and Tengnoupal subdivisions (now part of Tengnoupal district) were part of the Chandel district, and the district had one town (Moreh) 437 villages. As of 2022, the Chandel district has no towns and 264 villages.

Subdivisions 

Note: The Khengjoy subdivision did not exist at the time of the 2011 census.

Villages

Chandel subdivision 

The following villages listed on the district website (2022) are not listed in the 2011 census directory: Betuk, Chengkhu, Kapaam, and Mangkang.

Chakpikarong subdivision 

The following villages listed on the district website (2022) are not listed in the 2011 census directory: Bolchang and Kankhu.

Khengjoy subdivision

References 

Chandel